Aidan Jun Valcarcel Daniels (born September 6, 1998) is a Canadian professional soccer player who currently plays for the HFX Wanderers of the Canadian Premier League.

Club career

Toronto FC
On April 13, 2018, Daniels signed as a homegrown player with Major League Soccer side Toronto FC. On 21 April 2018, Daniels made his MLS debut with Toronto FC against Houston Dynamo.

Toronto FC II
When Daniels turned 17 on 8 July 2016, he signed a professional contract with Toronto FC II. A product of the Toronto FC Academy, he was rewarded with a loan to affiliate club Toronto FC II ahead of the 2016 USL season. Having already been capped internationally while playing for the academy, Daniels made his professional debut in the season opener on March 26, 2016. He played for 78 minutes in a 2–2 draw with New York Red Bulls II, before being replaced by Malik Johnson.
During the 2017 offseason, Daniels would train with Danish club HB Køge. Upon completion of the 2017 season, Daniels would re-sign with the club for the 2018 season. Daniels would be named the #20 rated prospect under 20 by the league in 2018. Daniels would have his option for the 2020 season declined by Toronto, ending his time with the club after two seasons.

Loan to Ottawa Fury FC

On March 6, 2019, it was announced that Daniels would be loaned to USL Championship club Ottawa Fury FC for the 2019 season.

Colorado Springs Switchbacks

Daniels would sign with USL Championship club Colorado Springs Switchbacks FC for the 2020 season. On July 11, he scored his first goal against New Mexico United. He later re-signed with the club for the 2021 season.

OKC Energy

On January 26, 2021, Daniels joined USL Championship side OKC Energy. In December 2021, Oklahoma City Energy would announce that they would go on hiatus for the 2022 season, ending Daniels' time with the club after one season.

HFX Wanderers
In January 2022, Canadian Premier League side HFX Wanderers announced they had signed Daniels to a two year deal. He made his debut for the Wanderers on April 7 against York United. Daniels scored his first goal for his new club on May 10 in the Canadian Championship, netting the second against Guelph United in a 2-0 victory. In January 2022 the Wanderers announced Daniels had signed a new contract through 2023, with added options for 2024 and 2025.

International

Youth

Daniels also qualifies to represent South Africa or the Philippines at senior level as his father hails from Johannesburg and his mother from Manila. After call-ups to the Canada Under-15 camps in USA and Laval in 2013, Daniels finally made his international debut in 2015. He made two appearances at the Under-17 CONCACAF Championship, the first coming in a 3–1 victory over Saint Lucia on March 9, 2015. His next appearance came just three days later in a 1–0 defeat to Panama. In February 2017, Daniels was named to Canada's roster for the 2017 CONCACAF U-20 Championship In May 2018, Daniels was named to Canada's under-21 squad for the 2018 Toulon Tournament. Daniels was named to the Canadian U-23 provisional roster for the 2020 CONCACAF Men's Olympic Qualifying Championship on February 26, 2020. He was named to the final squad for Olympic qualification on March 10, 2021.

Personal
Daniels' father was born in Johannesburg, South Africa and his mother was born in Manila, Philippines. His grandfather was a professional soccer player in South Africa and also played for Portuguese club Sporting CP. His uncles also played professionally, while an Achilles injury prevented his father from signing a professional contract.

Career statistics

References

1998 births
Living people
Canadian soccer players
Toronto FC II players
Association football midfielders
USL Championship players
Soccer people from Ontario
Sportspeople from Markham, Ontario
Canada men's youth international soccer players
Canadian people of South African descent
Canadian sportspeople of Filipino descent
Major League Soccer players
Toronto FC players
Ottawa Fury FC players
Colorado Springs Switchbacks FC players
OKC Energy FC players
Homegrown Players (MLS)
Canadian expatriate soccer players
Expatriate soccer players in the United States
Canadian expatriate sportspeople in the United States
HFX Wanderers FC players